Herapath is a surname. Notable people with the surname include:

 John Herapath (1790–1868), English physicist 
 William Bird Herapath (1820–1868), British surgeon/chemist who patented Herapathite
 Herapath's Journal, a 19th-century British railway journal edited by John Herapath